The Men's 10 m platform competition of the 2022 European Aquatics Championships was held on 21 August 2022.

Results

The preliminary round was started at 10:00. The final was held at 17:25.

Green denotes finalists

References

Diving